The Orlando Mavericks were a wood bat collegiate summer baseball league team located in Orlando, Florida. The team is a member of the Florida Collegiate Summer League (FCSL) and plays its home games at The First Academy.  The team joined the FCSL in the 2008 season, under the name the Clermont Mavericks and played their home games at East Ridge High School.

History
The Mavericks joined the FCSL in 2008 as an expansion team, one of three franchises joining the league that year.  This brought the total number of FCSL franchises to six.  In their inaugural season, the Mavericks reached the FCSL championship game at Tropicana Field where they defeated the Belleview Bulldogs 9-1 to win the FCSL championship. Under their second season the Mavericks once again made it to the FCSL Championship Game but lost to the Leesburg Lightning 5-1. In their third season the Clermont Mavericks moved to The First Academy near Downtown Orlando and became the Orlando Mavericks.

Playoff Appearances

References

External links
 FCSL website

Amateur baseball teams in Florida
Baseball teams established in 2008
2008 establishments in Florida
Defunct baseball teams in Florida
2010 disestablishments in Florida
Baseball teams disestablished in 2010
Sports teams in Orlando, Florida
Lake County, Florida